Halkarni is a city situated in the south west corner of Maharashtra, TK: Gadhinglaj Taluka, Kolhapur district - 416506, India. The population of Halkarni is around 9,000. It is surrounded by hills. The distance between Gadhinglaj and Halkarni is about 20  km. Buggdikatti and  Terani  are  villages  surrounding it . There are  number  of  private  hospitals and medicals are available in  the village. A government  hospital  was  built. Water is  supplied to the  whole  village  through  a well  in  NAREWADI  village  through a pipeline. Farming  is the  main  occupation  of  the  villagers. They  have  a  side  business  of  selling  milk  cow or buffalo to  the  milk dairies. A Maharashtra state  electricity board (MSEB) substation  is  installed  outside  the village. Halkarni  is  connected  to  Gadahinglaj  via  state  transport  buses (ST buses). Halkarni  is  also  connected  to Karnataka  via  Khanapur  through Karnataka  state  transport  buses . The  route  of  entering  in  Karnataka  from  Maharashra is  HALKARNI TO  SANKESHWAR.
Private  traveller  companies  came  to  exist  which  gives  services  to  reach  Mumbai and  Pune.

Language
Marathi being the state language is also spoken as a local language in Halkarni. Marathi is widely understood in Halkarni. English is also used in social communication.

Halkarni is popular for its market area. It is famous for tobacco powder (in Marathi called as Tapkir). It is surrounded by Basarge, Khanapur, and there are many temples like Ramling, Virbhadra, laxmi, Hanuman, the Jain temple, etc.

The schools are in Halalkarni :

Halkarni Bhag High School, Halkarni. Now junior college is also started...
Urdu Vidya Mandir Halkarni, Now started Urdh High School....

References

Cities and towns in Kolhapur district